Mr. Hercules Against Karate/Ming, ragazzi! is a 1973 Italian comedy Kung fu film directed by Antonio Margheriti that was filmed in Hong Kong, Singapore, Sydney and Bangkok. Produced by Carlo Ponti, the film features Bud Spencer and Terence Hill impersonators Alberto Terracina and Fernando Bilbao in a satire of the Kung-fu craze.

Plot
The film is about Danny (Roberto Terracina) and Percy (Fernando Arrien) who are fired from an oil rig in Australia when Percy accidentally destroys it. They retreat to a Chinese restaurant where they meet the owner Wang who offers them $100,000 if they return his son Henshu who has been taken by Henshu's stepmother and her boyfriend, a kung fu master. The two agree and fly to Hong Kong.

Reception
Tom Milne (Monthly Film Bulletin) gave the film a negative review, lamenting that one or two shots such as the carnival dragon in a dark alley "remind one that Margheriti has had his moments in the past as a minor-league Bava". Milne concluded that the film was "a dim carbon copy, studded with travelogue views and making heavy weather of its aimless roughhouse fights."

Cast
Alberto Terracina 	... Danny / Dino (billed as Tom Scott)
Fernando Bilbao 	... Percy / Parsifal (billed as Fred Harris)
Jolina Collins 	... Ai-Lan (billed as Jolina Mitchell)
Chai Lee 	... 	Lee-Ping
George Wang 	...  Ming
Sue Chang 	... 	Sue
Luciano Pigozzi ... Chief of Police (billed as Alan Collins)

Notes

References

External links
 

1973 films
Italian comedy films
Films directed by Antonio Margheriti
Films shot in Sydney
Films shot in Bangkok
Films shot in Hong Kong
Films shot in Singapore
United Artists films
Martial arts films
Kung fu films
Films with screenplays by Luciano Vincenzoni
Films with screenplays by Sergio Donati
1970s Italian films